Kamini Roy (12 October 1864 – 27 September 1933) was a Bengali poet, social worker and feminist in British India. She was the first woman honours graduate in British India.

Early life
Born on 12 October 1864 in the village of Basunda, then in Bakerganj District of Bengal Presidency and now in Jhalokati District of Bangladesh, Roy joined Bethune School in 1883. One of the first girls to attend school in British India, she earned a Bachelor of Arts degree with Sanskrit honours from Bethune College of the University of Calcutta in 1886 and started teaching there in the same year. Kadambini Ganguly, the country's second female honours graduate, attended the same institution in a class three years senior to Roy.

Nisith Chandra Sen, her brother, was a renowned barrister in the Calcutta High Court, and later the Mayor of Calcutta while her sister Jamini was the house physician of the Nepalese royal family. In 1894 she married Kedarnath Roy.

Writing and feminism

She picked up the cue for feminism from a fellow student of Bethune School, Abala Bose. Speaking to a girls' school in Calcutta, Roy said that, as Bharati Ray later paraphrased it, "the aim of women's education was to contribute to their all-round development and fulfillment of their potential".

In a Bengali essay titled The Fruit of the Tree of Knowledge she wrote,

In 1921, she was one of the leaders, along with Kumudini Mitra (Basu) and Mrinalini Sen, of the Bangiya Nari Samaj, an organization formed to fight for woman's suffrage. The Bengal Legislative Council granted limited suffrage to women in 1925, allowing Bengali women to exercise their right for the first time in the 1926 Indian general election.  She was a member of the Female Labour Investigation Commission (1922–23).

Honors and laurels
Roy supported younger writers and poets, including Sufia Kamal, who she visited in 1923. She was president of the Bengali Literary Conference in 1930 and vice-president of the Bangiya Sahitya Parishad in 1932–33.

She was influenced by the poet Rabindranath Tagore and Sanskrit literature. Calcutta University honoured her with the Jagattarini Gold Medal.

On 12 October 2019, Google commemorated Roy with a Google Doodle on her 155th birth anniversary. The accompanying write up started with her quote, “Why should a woman be confined to home and denied her rightful place in society?”

Works
Selected works include:

 Mahasweta, Pundorik 
 Pouraniki 
 Dwip O Dhup 
 Jibon Pathey 
 Nirmalya 
 Malya O Nirmalya
 Ashok Sangeet 
 Gunjan (Children's book) 
 Balika Sikkhar Adarsha (Essays)

References

Further reading

External links
 
Kamini Roy poems in Bengali

1864 births
1933 deaths
People from Barisal District
Bethune College alumni
University of Calcutta alumni
Poets from West Bengal
Bengali-language writers
Women writers from West Bengal
Indian feminist writers
Bengali female poets
19th-century Indian women writers
19th-century Indian writers
20th-century Indian women writers
20th-century Indian writers
People from Barisal